Shridhar is an Indian name. The name may refer to a number of persons shri: means wealth dhara means wear shridhar:one who wears wealth

People

Given name
Shridhar Hosalli, MTech ( vlsi and embedded system) Center manager and coordinator of ALS IAS Kalaburgi centre, India's top IAS coaching center delhi branch

 Shridhar Chillal, world record holder for having the longest fingernails on a single hand
 Shridhar Venkatesh Ketkar, Indian scholar
 Shridhar Sathe, professor of food science at Florida State University
 Shridhar Bhaskar Warnekar, Sanskrit scholar born in Nagpur, India
 Shridhar (actor), Indian actor

Surname
 Agni Shridhar, Indian writer, artist, and mobster
 Neeraj Shridhar, Indian film composer and singer-songwriter
 Arun Shridhar Vaidya, 13th Chief of Army Staff (CoAS) of the Indian Army
 Vibudh Shridhar, North Indian writer and poet
 Narayan Shridhar Bendre, Indian painter

Other
 13710 Shridhar, a Main-belt Asteroid discovered on August 17, 1998

See also
 Sridhar

Indian masculine given names
Surnames